Myron Howard Bright (March 5, 1919 – December 12, 2016) was an American lawyer and jurist who served as a United States circuit judge of the United States Court of Appeals for the Eighth Circuit.

Early life and education

Born in Eveleth, Minnesota, Bright graduated from Eveleth High School. He received an Associate of Arts degree from Eveleth Junior College (now Mesabi Range College) in 1939. He received a Bachelor of Science in Law from the University of Minnesota and a Bachelor of Laws from University of Minnesota Law School in 1947.

Career 
Bright served as a United States Air Force captain from 1942 to 1946. He later worked in private practice of law in Fargo, North Dakota from 1947 to 1968.

Federal judicial service

Bright was nominated by President Lyndon B. Johnson on April 25, 1968, to a seat on the United States Court of Appeals for the Eighth Circuit vacated by Judge Charles Joseph Vogel. He was confirmed by the United States Senate on June 6, 1968, and received his commission the next day. He assumed senior status on June 1, 1985, and remained in post until his death in Fargo on December 12, 2016, at the age of 97.

See also
 List of United States federal judges by longevity of service

References

Sources
 

1919 births
2016 deaths
20th-century American judges
21st-century American judges
Judges of the United States Court of Appeals for the Eighth Circuit
Military personnel from Minnesota
North Dakota lawyers
People from Eveleth, Minnesota
Lawyers from Fargo, North Dakota
United States Air Force officers
United States court of appeals judges appointed by Lyndon B. Johnson
University of Minnesota Law School alumni